Spatalistis delta is a species of moth of the family Tortricidae. It is found in Vietnam.

References

Moths described in 2003
delta
Moths of Asia
Taxa named by Józef Razowski